Dick Glacier is a tributary glacier,  long, flowing west from Mount Campbell to enter Shackleton Glacier just north of Taylor Nunatak, in the Queen Maud Mountains of Antarctica. It was named by the Advisory Committee on Antarctic Names for Lieutenant Alan L. Dick, a member of U.S. Navy Squadron VX-6 during Operation Deep Freeze 1964.

See also
 List of glaciers in the Antarctic
 Glaciology

References 

Glaciers of Dufek Coast